Guru Gobind Singh Indraprastha University, formerly Indraprastha University (IP or IPU), is a state university located in Dwarka, Delhi, India. The campus occupies 78 acres (31.56 hectares), among the largest in Delhi, and enrolls over 8,000 students.

Indraprastha University was established on 28 March 1998 by the Govt. of NCT Delhi, named after Indraprastha, capital of the kingdom led by the Pandavas mentioned in Indian epic Mahabharata. In 2001, the university was officially renamed as Guru Gobind Singh Indraprastha University (GGSIPU) after the tenth Sikh Guru Gobind Singh.

The university is organized around fourteen university schools and three university centers that focus on programs in law, medicine, technology, education, entrepreneurship, science and business.

History

Guru Gobind Singh Indraprastha University was established as Indraprastha University (IPU) on 28 March 1998 by the Govt. of NCT Delhi as a state university under the provisions of Guru Gobind Singh Indraprastha University Act, 1998 with its Amendment in 1999. The university is recognised by University Grants Commission (India), under section 12B of the UGC Act. The university was named after the ancient mythological city of Indraprastha, which features prominently in the epic Mahabharata. In 2001, the university was officially renamed as Guru Gobind Singh Indraprastha University (GGSIPU) after the tenth Sikh Guru Gobind Singh.

Organisation and administration 
The university has 14 university schools(colleges of the university), 12 of them are on the campus in Dwarka and 2 schools, USAR and USDI are on the new East Delhi campus. There are 4 centers within the university for research in Disaster Management Studies, Pharmaceutical Sciences (CEPS), Human Values & Ethics and a center for Incubation-cum-Technology Commercialization (UCITC). Three of these centers are in the campus in Dwarka while UCITC is in the East Delhi campus.

University schools 
GGSIPU university is home to 14 university schools functioning from its Dwarka and East Delhi Campus.

Affiliated Colleges 

There are more than 120 affiliates of the university, which are run according to the rules and regulation set by the university.

Academics

World Ranking 
According to webometrics, IP university has a world ranking of 3374 . It has a continental ranking of 1073 and country rank of 162.

Ranking

The university was ranked 66 among Indian universities by the National Institutional Ranking Framework (NIRF) in 2019 and 95 in the overall category. The University School of Engineering & Technology was ranked 73 by NIRF engineering ranking and the University School of Management Studies was ranked 62 in the management ranking.

Notable alumni
 Gaurav Sharma
 Gaurav Gogoi
 Guneet Monga
 Taapsee Pannu
 Manish Singh
 Devika Vaid
 Saurabh Bhardwaj
 Prachi Tehlan
 Nalini Negi
 Anupam Amod

See also
 Education in Delhi
 University Grants Commission (India)

References

External links
 
 Guru Gobind Singh Indraprastha University

 
Educational institutions established in 1998
Medical Council of India
Distance education institutions based in India
1998 establishments in Delhi
Memorials to Guru Gobind Singh